A blood bike is a motorcycle used to courier urgent and emergency medical items including blood, X-rays, samples, drugs, and documentation between hospitals and other healthcare facilities.

In the United Kingdom and Ireland, a network of largely independent registered charities, whose members are all unpaid volunteers, provide blood bike courier services in collaboration with their local healthcare authorities. Many are represented through the Nationwide Association of Blood Bikes (NABB).

Commercially-run blood bike courier services also exist.

History

The first blood bike volunteer group to be established in the United Kingdom was the Emergency Volunteer Service (EVS), formed in 1962 in Surrey, England, by Margaret Ryerson and her husband. In 1969, the Freewheelers youth community action group formed in Stevenage which initially served hospitals in Stevenage, Luton, Dunstable, Bedford and Hitchin. These original groups are no longer operating, but other groups emerged that provide similar services.

Yeovil Freewheelers was founded in 1978. In 1981, SERV, which formed shortly after the original EVS disbanded, and the North East Thames Region Emergency Voluntary Service (also known as the EVS) in north east London, were founded. North East Thames Region EVS disbanded in November 1998, but SERV continues to operate as a number of different groups.

The Nationwide Association of Blood Bikes was established in 2008 to promote professional standards across all the member blood bike groups.

As an example of the scale of their operations, in 2010, one group made 2,500 deliveries at a cost of around £25,000, paid for by charitable donations, which according to NABB saved the NHS over £120,000. There are no exact figures for how much blood bikes save the NHS annually, however NABB estimates that it was approximately £1.4million in 2016.

In the August 2018 Budget, the government introduced Vehicle Excise Duty (VED) exemption for blood bikes vehicles, effective from April 2020, "to align the tax treatment of the transportation of blood and medical supplies by the national charity Blood Bikes with other emergency vehicles". Blood Bike charities were now formally recognised as an emergency service.

In 2019, Warwickshire and Solihull Blood Bikes, which started in 2012, was told that University Hospitals Coventry and Warwickshire NHS Trust was dispensing with its services, and would be replaced by a commercial contract with QE Facilities, a subsidiary company of Gateshead Health NHS Foundation Trust.

Blood bike groups
There are a number of blood bike groups operating in the UK and Ireland. These include:

England:
 Freewheelers EVS – Bath, Bristol, Gloucestershire (south), Somerset, West Wiltshire
 Nottinghamshire Blood Bikes – Nottinghamshire
 SERV – various areas
 Severn Freewheelers – Gloucestershire, Herefordshire, Wiltshire, Worcestershire
 Whiteknights Yorkshire Blood Bikes –  Yorkshire

Scotland:
 ScotsERVS (Scottish Emergency Rider Volunteer Service)
 Blood Bikes Scotland

Wales:
 Blood Bikes Wales

Ireland:
 Blood Bike Leinster — Leinster Ireland

Australia

Inspired by the UK model, Blood Bikes Australia was founded in Brisbane, Queensland, in September 2019, with a run by Peter Davis for the Mater Hospital. Since then, the number of qualified volunteers has risen rapidly across the country.

Awards
Several groups have received The Queen's Award for Voluntary Service:
 2008 – Freewheelers EVS
 2016 – North West Blood Bikes Lancashire & Lakes
 2017 – Northumbria Blood Bikes
 2017 – SERV Sussex
 2018 – Shropshire, Staffordshire and Cheshire Blood Bikes
 2019 - SERV Suffolk & Cambridgeshire
 2020 - SERV Surrey and London, SERV Kent

Blood Bike Awareness Day 
The first Blood Bike Awareness Day took place on Friday 14 August 2015, with initial support provided by O2 and has continued annually since. It is to be held on the Friday closest to 14 August. Reasons for this include it being the mirror to 14 February and St Valentine's day with its association with the heart and thus blood, being summer the news cycle is often devoid of political stories and there is a greater propensity for journalists to fill airtime with such awareness days also compounded by Fridays being shown even more inclined to cover such local news topics.

Incidents 
Motorcyclists are classified as vulnerable road users as when the casualty and fatality numbers are adjusted to passenger miles covered it is the most dangerous form of transport when compared to walking, cycling and various four wheeled vehicles. Two blood bike riders have been involved in fatal accidents:
28 November 2016  Martin Dixon of Bloodrun EVS (Cleveland and North Yorkshire) was killed while on duty in a traffic collision.
5 May 2018  Russell Curwen of North West Blood Bikes was killed while on duty in a traffic collision. In 2019, a laboratory in Morecambe run by University Hospitals of Morecambe Bay NHS Foundation Trust was named in Curwen's memory.

See also
 Emergency medical services in the United Kingdom
 Emergency medical services in Ireland

References

External links

Nationwide Association of Blood Bikes, the umbrella charity representing blood bikes in the United Kingdom